The East Branch of the Baker River is a  river in western New Hampshire in the United States. It is a tributary of the Baker River, part of the Pemigewasset River and Merrimack River watersheds.

The river rises on the southernmost slopes of Mount Moosilauke in the town of Woodstock.  Flowing south, it quickly enters the town of Warren and crosses twice under Route 118 before joining the main stem of the Baker.

See also

List of rivers of New Hampshire

References

Tributaries of the Merrimack River
Rivers of New Hampshire
Rivers of Grafton County, New Hampshire